This is a list of places, buildings, roads and other things named for King Hussein. It is divided by category, though each item's location is noted in the entry.

Hospitals
 King Hussein Cancer Center
 King Hussein Medical Center

Airports
 King Hussein International Airport

Hussein, King